Black Irish is a 2007 American independent coming-of-age drama film directed, written, and co-produced by Brad Gann. It stars Michael Angarano, Brendan Gleeson, Tom Guiry, Emily VanCamp, and Melissa Leo and tells the story of a South Boston youngster trying to win the affection of his emotionally remote father and maintain intimacy with other members of his dysfunctional clan.

Plot
Sixteen-year-old Cole McKay’s struggle for independence is put to the test as his South Boston Irish-Catholic family implodes around him. Older brother Terry is descending into a life of drugs and crime, pregnant sister Kathleen is being sent away to cover up the shame of unwed motherhood and Cole’s father, Desmond, spends his days in a fog of alcohol and self-pity, silently torturing himself over what might have been. The one thing keeping young Cole’s head above water is his love of baseball. The movie starts with Cole practicing his pitching, when he is picked up by his family to attend the funeral of Desmond's sister.   A talented baseball pitcher, Cole overcomes self-doubt and family indifference to fight his way into the state championships. To get there he must make a life or death decision, one that will change the McKay family forever.

Cast
 Michael Angarano as Cole McKay
 Brendan Gleeson as Desmond McKay
 Tom Guiry as Terry McKay
 Emily VanCamp as Kathleen McKay
 Melissa Leo as Margaret McKay
 Michael Rispoli as Joey
 Francis Capra as Anthony
 Wilson Better as Graves
 Bonnie Dennison as Maria
 Finn Curtin as Coach Mahoney
 Frank T. Wells as Father Magruder 
 Kevin Chapman as Officer Pierce
 Bates Wilder as Officer Cowen
 Joe McEachern as Officer Gianelli
 John Fiore as Tommy Orsini

Release
The film premiered at the Newport Beach Film Festival on 20 April 2007. It received a limited release, opening in Los Angeles, New York City and Boston on 26 October 2007. It was released on DVD on 8 January 2008 in the US and Canada.

Reception
On Rotten Tomatoes the film has an approval rating of 31% based on reviews from 13 critics.

References

External links
 
 
 
 Official Site
 Official Myspace Site
 Official Movie Trailer

2007 films
2000s sports drama films
American sports drama films
Films set in Boston
American baseball films
Films about dysfunctional families
Films about Irish-American culture
Films scored by John Frizzell (composer)
2007 drama films
2000s English-language films
2000s American films